U.S. Route 25 (US 25) is a north–south United States Highway that runs for  in the southern and midwestern US. Its southern terminus is in Brunswick, Georgia, from where it proceeds mostly due north, passing through the cities of Augusta, Georgia, Greenville, South Carolina, and Asheville, North Carolina, before dividing into two branches, known as U.S. Route 25W and U.S. Route 25E between Newport, Tennessee, and North Corbin, Kentucky. After passing through Richmond and Lexington, Kentucky, it reaches its northern terminus at Ohio state line in Covington, Kentucky. The route is an important crossing of the Appalachian Mountains, and it is covered by three of the corridors of the Appalachian Development Highway System. When the highway was originally established in 1926, the route extended from North Augusta, South Carolina to Port Huron, Michigan. The southern end was extended to its current terminus in 1936, while the northern end was truncated in 1974.

Route description

|-
|GA
|190.0
|305.8
|-
|SC
|140.6
|226.3
|-
|NC
|75.4
|121.3
|-
|TN
|20.3
|32.7
|-
|25E
|112.8
|181.5
|-
|25W
|145.7
|234.5
|-
|KY
|177.3
|285.3
|-
|Total
|862.1
|1,387.4
|}

Georgia

Starting at the intersection of US 17/SR 25 in Brunswick, US 25 goes northwest to Jesup then northeast to Ludowici.  It then stays at a general north route through the cities of Statesboro, Millen, Waynesboro and finally Augusta, where it crosses the Savannah River into South Carolina.  As it led south from Augusta, the predecessor thoroughfare was known as the “Southeastern Plank Road” which later became “Peach Orchard Road” which name is still in use in South Richmond County. The plank road likely connected with the Florida-Georgia Plank Road from Brunswick to Jacksonville. Currently, the overall majority of Route 25 is four-lane.

South Carolina

Entering South Carolina from Augusta, Georgia, US 25 goes north through downtown North Augusta, connecting with I-20 just outside town.  US 25 goes northwesterly through the cities of Edgefield, Greenwood, and Greenville; going due north at Travelers Rest to the North Carolina state line.  Majority of the route is four-lane, with various sections at expressway grade.

North Carolina

US 25 becomes a freeway from the state line in Tuxedo, in Henderson County. It continues for  before connecting with I-26/US 74 near East Flat Rock.  Splitting from I-26/US 74 near Fletcher, it goes north through Arden, Biltmore Forest, and downtown Asheville, before reconnecting with I-26 near Woodfin.  At Weaverville, US 25 and US 70 travel northwesterly together, through Marshall and Hot Springs into Tennessee.

Tennessee

In concurrency with US 70 and SR 9, US 25 enters the state through the Bald Mountains, followed by crossing the French Broad River along Wolf Creek Bridge.  Along the northern bank of the French Broad River, it crosses back over and leaves the Cherokee National Forest.  US 25 enters Newport, after crossing the Pigeon River, and serves as Broadway Street through the downtown area.  At the western edge of Newport, US 25 splits: US 25E towards Morristown and US 25W towards Knoxville.

U.S. Route 25E

Entering Kentucky via the Cumberland Gap Tunnel, it connects the cities of Middlesboro and Barbourville. In North Corbin, after merging back with US 25W, a US 25E connector continues west to I-75.

U.S. Route 25W

Going north in parallel or in concurrency with I-75, it goes through  Caryville, Jacksboro, La Follette and Jellico, before crossing the Tennessee/Kentucky line. Continuing north, it goes through Williamsburg before going through downtown Corbin and then reconnecting with US 25E in North Corbin.

Kentucky

US 25 starts again in North Corbin and traverses north, in parallel with I-75, connecting the cities of London, Berea, Richmond, Lexington and Dry Ridge.  US 25 ends in Covington at the Ohio state line over the Ohio River along Clay Wade Bailey Bridge; US 42/US 127 continue into Cincinnati.

ADHS corridors
US 25 overlaps with three corridors that are part of the Appalachian Development Highway System (ADHS), which is part of Appalachian Regional Commission (ARC).  Passed in 1965, the purpose of ADHS is to generate economic development in previously isolated areas, supplement the interstate system, connect Appalachia to the interstate system, and provide access to areas within the Region as well as to markets in the rest of the nation.

 Corridor F: From I-75, in Caryville, Tennessee, to US 23, in Jenkins, Kentucky.  US 25W overlaps a  section in Caryville; though already a four-lane boulevard, it is slated to be improved upon in that area.  US 25E overlaps a  section, centered around the Cumberland Gap area.  From Harrogate, Tennessee to Pineville, Kentucky, US 25E is a mostly four-lane limited-access road with interchanges at major intersections.
 Corridor S: From I-81, near Morristown, Tennessee, to SR 63, in Harrogate, Tennessee.  The entire  section of US 25E is authorized for ADHS funding.  As of 2013,  is still slated for construction along the route.  Cutting through various mountain ridges, US 25E provides a four-lane limited-access road with interchanges at major intersections.
 Corridor W: From I-85, in Greenville, South Carolina, to I-26/US 74, near East Flat Rock, North Carolina.  Of the  section of US 25, only  was authorized for ADHS funding.  In 2013, both states have completed Corridor W.  US 25 in South Carolina provides a four-to-six-lane limited-access road, with interchanges at major intersections; while US 25 in North Carolina is a four-lane controlled-access highway.

History

US 25 was established on November 11, 1926, as part of the original United States Numbered Highway System; it was routed along the Dixie Highway from North Augusta, South Carolina, to Port Huron, Michigan, with two divides (US 25E and US 25W) through Tennessee and Kentucky, with US 25E having also a short section in Virginia. In 1928, one divided section between Richmond and Newport, Kentucky, was removed; US 25 followed the US 25W routing, while US 25E was mostly replaced by US 27. In 1929, US 25 was extended south into Georgia, ending at US 80 near Statesboro, Georgia. In 1933, US 25 was extended north from Port Huron to Port Austin, Michigan. In 1936, US 25 was extended south again to its current terminus at US 17 in Brunswick, Georgia. In 1957, US 25 was shifted onto new four-lane road in Richmond County, Georgia.

In 1974, US 25 was eliminated in Ohio and Michigan, establishing its northern terminus on the Clay Wade Bailey Bridge in Covington, Kentucky. Its former alignment was replaced by Interstate 75 between Cincinnati and Detroit, and Interstate 94 between Detroit and Port Huron. M-25 continues as the designation of former US 25 between Port Huron and Port Austin, while Ohio State Route 25 much of the former route from Toledo to near Cygnet, Ohio.

In 2000, US 25E was rerouted through the Cumberland Gap Tunnel (opened four years prior), making a direct link between Tennessee and Kentucky, eliminating Virginia's short section. Its old alignment that went through historic Cumberland Gap was handed over to the Cumberland Gap National Historical Park, and the former roadbed through the park restored to an early 19th-century wagon path.

Major intersections
Southern segment
Georgia
  in Brunswick
  in Brunswick. The highways travel concurrently to Jesup.
  in Dock Junction
  in Jesup. US 25/US 301 travel concurrently to Statesboro.
  in Jesup. The highways travel concurrently to Ludowici.
  in Claxton
  south-southeast of Register
  in Statesboro. The highways travel concurrently to Hopeulikit.
  in Augusta
  in Augusta. The highways travel concurrently to North Augusta, South Carolina.
South Carolina
  in North Augusta
  north-northwest of Edgefield
  south-southeast of Greenwood. The highways travel concurrently to southeast of Hodges.
  in Greenwood. The highways travel concurrently through the city.
  in Princeton. The highways travel concurrently to northwest of Princeton.
  south of Gantt
  on the Gantt–Greenville city line
  south-southwest of Dunean
  on the Welcome–Parker city line
  south of Travelers Rest. The highways travel concurrently, but on different lanes, to Travelers Rest.
North Carolina
  south of East Flat Rock
  east of East Flat Rock. The highways travel concurrently to Fletcher.
  in Hendersonville
  in Asheville
  in Asheville
  in Woodfin. I-26/US 19/US 23/US 25 travel concurrently to Weaverville. US 25/US 70 travel concurrently to Newport, Tennessee.
Tennessee
  in Newport. The highways travel concurrently through the city.
  in Newport

Northern segment
Kentucky
  in North Corbin
  east-southeast of Mt. Vernon
  in Mt. Vernon
  in Mt. Vernon
  south-southeast of Richmond. The highways travel concurrently to Lexington.
  in Richmond
  south-southeast of Lexington. The highways travel concurrently to Lexington.
  in Lexington. The highways travel concurrently through the city.
  in Lexington
  in Georgetown
  in Florence. The highways travel concurrently to the Ohio state line.
  in Crestview Hills
  in Fort Mitchell
  in Covington

See also

 Special routes of U.S. Route 25
 Dixie Highway

References

External links

}
 Endpoints of US highway 25

 
25